Parry House may refer to:
William D. Parry House, Marble, Colorado, a National Register of Historic Places listing in Gunnison County, Colorado
John E. Parry House, Glens Falls, New York
Parry House (Highland Falls, New York)
Hollister-Parry House, Woodsfield, Ohio
Parry Lodge, Kanab, Utah, a National Register of Historic Places listing in Kane County, Utah
Cox-Shoemaker-Parry House, Manti, Utah, a National Register of Historic Places listing in Sanpete County, Utah

See also
Perry House (disambiguation)